Lenuţa Nicoleta Grasu is a retired Romanian discus thrower. She was born on 11 September 1971 in Secuieni as Nicoleta Grădinaru, but took a new surname when she married fellow discus thrower Costel Grasu. 

Grasu is best known for winning medals at the 1999 and 2001 World Championships. A few years followed without any international medals, but she did finish sixth at the 2004 Summer Olympics and fifth at the 2005 World Championships. In 2006, she returned to the medal podium with a bronze at the European Championships.

Her personal best throw is 68.80 metres, achieved in August 1999 in Poiana Braşov.

International competitions

Personal
Nicoleta and Costel's child Ștefan Grasu is a professional basketball player.

External links

1971 births
Living people
Romanian female discus throwers
Athletes (track and field) at the 1992 Summer Olympics
Athletes (track and field) at the 1996 Summer Olympics
Athletes (track and field) at the 2000 Summer Olympics
Athletes (track and field) at the 2004 Summer Olympics
Athletes (track and field) at the 2008 Summer Olympics
Athletes (track and field) at the 2012 Summer Olympics
Olympic athletes of Romania
World Athletics Championships medalists
European Athletics Championships medalists
Universiade medalists in athletics (track and field)
Universiade gold medalists for Romania
Universiade bronze medalists for Romania
Medalists at the 1997 Summer Universiade
Medalists at the 1999 Summer Universiade